Jack Cleary (9 February 1922 – 12 October 1981) was an  Australian rules footballer who played with Hawthorn in the Victorian Football League (VFL).

Notes

External links 

1922 births
1981 deaths
Australian rules footballers from Victoria (Australia)
Hawthorn Football Club players
Royal Australian Air Force personnel of World War II